The 2015 Jigawa State gubernatorial election was the 6th gubernatorial election of Jigawa State. Held on April 11, 2015, the All Progressives Congress nominee Mohammed Badaru Abubakar won the election, defeating Aminu Ibrahim Ringim of the People's Democratic Party.

APC primary
APC candidate, Mohammed Badaru Abubakar clinched the party ticket. The APC primary election was held in 2014.

PDP primary
PDP candidate, Aminu Ibrahim Ringim clinched the party ticket. The PDP primary election was held in 2014.

Results 
A total of 4 candidates contested in the election. Mohammed Badaru Abubakar from the All Progressives Congress won the election, defeating Aminu Ibrahim Ringim from the People's Democratic Party, Sardauna Yanleman from All Progressives Grand Alliance and Musa Galamawa from National Conscience Party. Registered voters was 1,819,773, accredited voters was 1,217,504, 26,977 votes was cancelled, valid votes was 1,130,883. The winner, Mohammed Badaru Abubakar won by 168,598 votes.

References 

Jigawa State gubernatorial elections
Jigawa gubernatorial
April 2015 events in Nigeria